Tortum Dam is a dam on the Tortum River in Erzurum Province, Turkey. The development,  backed by the Turkish State Hydraulic Works, was built on a natural landslide near Tortum Waterfall and raises the level of the existing lake for hydroelectric power production.

See also

List of dams and reservoirs in Turkey

References
 

Dams in Erzurum Province
Dams on the Çoruh River
Hydroelectric power stations in Turkey
Dams completed in 1972
Landslide-dammed lakes